Alyaksey Krawchanka (born 15 January 1985) is a Belarusian professional football coach and former player.

External links
 
 

1985 births
Living people
Belarusian footballers
Association football midfielders
FC Gomel players
FC Vitebsk players
FC Dnepr Mogilev players
FC Rechitsa-2014 players
FC DSK Gomel players
FC Dynamo Brest players
FC Lokomotiv Gomel players
FC Sputnik Rechitsa players
Belarusian football managers
FC Sputnik Rechitsa managers